During the 1968–69 season Hearts competed in the Scottish First Division, the Scottish Cup, the Scottish League Cup and the East of Scotland Shield.

Fixtures

Friendlies

East of Scotland Shield

League Cup

Scottish Cup

Scottish First Division

See also 
List of Heart of Midlothian F.C. seasons

References 

Statistical Record 68-69

External links 
Official Club website

Heart of Midlothian F.C. seasons
Heart of Midlothian